The Wüeribach (also called the Dorfbach and Fischbach in its upper reaches) is a tributary of the Reppisch, around 8 kilometres long, in the Canton of Zürich in Switzerland. It rises in the municipality of Bonstetten, flows through the narrow Wüerital valley and reaches the Reppisch valley near Birmensdorf, wo it empties, parallel to the rather smaller Lunnerenbach, into the lower Reppisch. The Wüeribach is the longest and biggest tributary of the Reppisch and has an average flow rate of 310 L/s.

Geography

Course 
From here it flows initially mainly in a northwestern direction through the village of Bonstetten, much of it being canalized as it passes through. It leaves the village and runs, having been straightened out, through fields across a wide plain in a northern direction. Shortly afterwards the stream reaches the municipal boundary with Wettswil am Albis, where it is called the Fischbach. It passes to the west of the village and collects the waters of the roughly four-kilometre-long Fridgraben. It reaches the northern municipal boundary with Birmensdorf, where the stream snakes through the narrow Wüerital into the Reppisch valley. This valley was formed in the last ice age as a meltwater gully of the Wettswiler and the Aescher Zunge of the Reuss Glacier.

Catchment 
The catchment area is 14.6 km² and extends over the districts of Affoltern and Dietikon. 51.6% of the catchment area is used for agriculture, 24.6% is built up and 23.9% is near-natural vegetation and forest.

In the south is the catchment of the Hofibach, which drains into the Jonen; in the west is the catchment of the Aescherbach and to the east and north lies the valley of the Reppisch.

Tributaries 
First- and higher-order tributaries of the Wüeribach with their length:
Wüeribach source
Strassacherbach (left), 1.1 km
Bodenfeldbach	(left), 0.8 km
Fluechbach (left), 2 km
Dornmattbach (right), 0.5 km
right-hand side arm (right), 0.1 km
Hirschenbach (left), 0.9 km
Chäserenbach (right), 0.2 km
Lüttenbergbach (left), 0.5 km
Schrannenbach/Schrannenbächli (left), 0.3 km
Fridgraben (right), 4,2 km
Isenbach (left), 0.4 km
Schladmatterbach (left), 0.3 km
Schachenbach (right), 1.1 km
Hofächerbach (right), 0.4 km
Wettswiler West Channel (left), 0.7 km
Filderenbach (left), 1.3 km
Täntenbach (left), 1.1 km
Cholholzbächli (left), 0.1 km
Gättikerbächli (left), 0.2 km
Aescherbach (left), 3.2 km
Sunnebrunne (left), 0.1 km
Moosbächli (right), 0.2 km
Uelisweidbächli (right), 1 km
Stierenwaldbach (left), 0.8 km
Eichholzbach (right), 0.5 km
Chürzibach (right), 1.5 km
Mättlibach (left), 0.2 km
Rebacherbach (right), 0.2 km
Sägissenbach (left), 0.2 km
Chilstigbächli (left), 0.2 km
Wüeribach mouth

Sources 
Geoinformation system of the canton of Zürich

References 

Rivers of the canton of Zürich
1Wueribach
Rivers of Switzerland